Honorary Captain Sriram Singh Shekhawat (born 14 November 1948) is a former Indian middle-distance runner.

Sriram Singh joined Rajputana Rifles in 1968 where he came under the influence of the coach Ilyas Babar. Babar persuaded him to shift his focus from 400 meters to 800 meters.

In the 1970 Asian Games in Bangkok, he was beaten to the second place in the 800 meters by Jimmy Crampton of Burma. Singh was eliminated in the heats of the Munich Olympics in 1972 but his time of 1:47.7 bettered Crampton's Asian record. Prior to the competition he had never run on synthetic tracks. He improved his time to 1:47.6 to win the gold in the 1974 Asian Games.

The high point of Sriram Singh's career was the 800m race in 1976 Montreal Olympics. The qualifying round, the semifinal and the final were run on successive days. In the first race, he broke his own Asian record with a time of 1:45.86 In the semifinal, he came fourth in a time of 1:46.42

In the final, Singh made a huge rush from the break at 300 meters to take lead at the bell with a time of 50.85 ahead of Cuban Alberto Juantorena's 50.90. Juantorena caught up with him around the 550m mark and won in a world record time of 1:43.50. Singh faded away in the home straight to finish seventh with a time of 1:45.77. Juantorena later attributed his world record to Sriram's front running.

Sriram Singh's time stood as the Asian record until it was broken by Lee Jin-il in 1994 and as a national record for 42 years until it was broken by Jinson Johnson in June 2018.

In the year 1973, he was awarded the prestigious Arjuna Award, as recognition to his extraordinary achievements in Athletics.

In the year 1974, he was awarded the prestigious civil award of Padma Shri as recognition to his contribution to the field of sport.

He retained his 800 m gold medal in the 1978 Asian Games (1:48.80), but was eliminated in the heats of the same event in the Moscow Olympics.
He also won 800m Silver medal in 1973 Asian Athletics Championships and 3 Gold medals for 400 m, 800 m and 4×400 m relay in 1975 Asian Athletics Championships.

Post retirement he has taken up the job of mentoring talented youth in the sport and garners a lot of respect to this day

International competitions

References

 K. Arumugam and Gulu Ezekiel, Great Indian Olympians

External links
 

Sports personalities_ Sri Ram Singh Shekawat

1950 births
Living people
Athletes from Rajasthan
Indian male middle-distance runners
Olympic athletes of India
Athletes (track and field) at the 1972 Summer Olympics
Athletes (track and field) at the 1976 Summer Olympics
Athletes (track and field) at the 1980 Summer Olympics
Asian Games gold medalists for India
Asian Games silver medalists for India
Asian Games medalists in athletics (track and field)
Athletes (track and field) at the 1970 Asian Games
Athletes (track and field) at the 1974 Asian Games
Athletes (track and field) at the 1978 Asian Games
Medalists at the 1970 Asian Games
Medalists at the 1974 Asian Games
Medalists at the 1978 Asian Games
Recipients of the Arjuna Award
Recipients of the Padma Shri in sports